The 2020–21 First League of the Federation of Bosnia and Herzegovina  and also known as m:tel First League for sponsorship reasons, was the 26st season of the First League of the Federation of Bosnia and Herzegovina, the second tier football league of Bosnia and Herzegovina. The season began on 8 August 2020 and ended on 5 June 2021.

Olimpik were the last champions, having won their third championship title in the 2019–20 season and earning promotion to the Premier League of Bosnia and Herzegovina.

Teams

League table

Results

Top goalscorers

See also
2020–21 Premier League of Bosnia and Herzegovina
2020–21 Bosnia and Herzegovina Football Cup

References

External links
Official site for the Football Federation of Bosnia and Herzegovina
Official site for the Football Federation of the Federation of Bosnia and Herzegovina

2
Bos
First League of the Federation of Bosnia and Herzegovina seasons